Gurney Wharf is a planned seafront park, with land for this purpose currently being reclaimed off Gurney Drive in George Town, Penang. Intended as a "new iconic waterfront destination for Penang", Phase 1 of Gurney Wharf is scheduled for completion by 2018.

Upon the expected completion of Gurney Wharf by August 2021, the 24.28-hectare seafront park will comprise four distinct recreational areas - a beach, a coastal grove, a water garden, and a seaside retail food and beverages (F&B) area.

History 

Originally, plans to reclaim land off Gurney Drive were intended to provide more land for residential development, particularly the Seri Tanjung Pinang project off nearby Tanjung Tokong, which was carried out by Tanjung Pinang Development Sdn Bhd. The Penang state government later proposed turning 24.28 hectares of the reclaimed land into a seafront public park.

Accordingly, the parent firm of Tanjung Pinang Development, Eastern & Oriental Berhad, is to surrender  of the reclaimed land for free to the Penang state government. Reclamation costs will be borne by Eastern & Oriental, while the landscaping expenses will be covered by the Penang state government.

In addition, Eastern & Oriental, at its own expense, also sought the services of three internationally-renowned architectural consultants - GDP Architects, Grant Associates and Jerde. The combined credentials of the three firms include major urban projects such as Singapore's Gardens by the Bay and the Roppongi Hills in Tokyo.

In 2016, land reclamation off Gurney Drive commenced, creating an almost -long bund that is 100 metres from Gurney Drive at its nearest point and about 500 metres at its furthest by the end of the year. This was done by Tanjung Pinang Development Sdn Bhd The method of reclamation was the sand filling and soil treatment method. It was used for both STP1 (Seri Tanjung Pinang) and STP2. This is the same method as used in the reclamation of land for Tuas Biomedical Park 2, Hong Kong Disneyland, Hong Kong International Airport, the Betuweroute Railway and the Palm Jumeirah. The first phase of the Gurney Wharf project is slated for completion in 2018.

In May 2019, Penang local Government Committee chairman Jagdeep Singh Deo suggested that new state assembly building should be built on Gurney Wharf.

In July 2019, the reclamation project was identified by Jagdeep Singh Deo, chairman of State Housing, Town and Country Planning Committee as an example of how one could implement the proposed Penang South Reclamation (PSR) project. Nevertheless, the PSR project has many stumbling blocks to overcome as the Penang government needs to fulfill all 72 requirements set out in the Environmental Impact Assessment before the Ministry of Environment and Water would allow the state government to proceed with the project.

Phases

Phase 1 
The first phase covers three of the four distinct components of the public park - the beach, coastal grove and water gardens. 

The beach will be extended by 80 metres by incorporating an artificial beach 400 metres long. The coastal grove, to be sited near a stretch of casuarina trees along Gurney Drive, will be equipped with recreational facilities such as a skate park. Meanwhile, the water gardens will include gardens, ponds and wetlands irrigated by an innovative water filtration system, similar to that of the Gardens by the Bay in Singapore.

Phase 2 
The second phase involves the construction of a retail precinct with F&B outlets, dining facilities and a pier walk. The famous Gurney Drive Hawker Centre will also be moved to this location upon the completion of Phase 2, scheduled in 2020.

In July 2019, Jagdeep Singh Deo, said that he expected the reclamation works for the Gurney Wharf project to be completed by the end of September of the same year.

In December 2019, it was announced that reclamation had been recently completed, with some still to be handed over to the state government in 2020. Work would be begin in June 2020 on other components such as a promenade, a park, a skating rink, a children’s playground and a man-made beach.

In February 2020, the state government said that they expect the Gurney Wharf project to be completed by August 2021.

See also 
 Gurney Drive

References

Penang Integrated Transportation Masterplan
Buildings and structures under construction in Penang
Tourist attractions in George Town, Penang
Redeveloped ports and waterfronts
Waterfronts